Marina Anatolyevna Antipova (born 29 September 1992) is a Russian ice dancer. With former partner Artem Kudashev, she is a three-time ISU Junior Grand Prix silver medalist and the 2009 Russian junior bronze medalist.

Programs 
(with Kudashev)

Competitive highlights 
(with Kudashev)

References

External links 

 
 

Russian female ice dancers
1992 births
Living people
Sportspeople from Tolyatti